The 1894 North Dakota gubernatorial election was held on November 6, 1894. Republican nominee Roger Allin defeated People's Party nominee Elmer D. Wallace with 55.76% of the vote.

General election

Candidates
Major party candidates
Roger Allin, Republican
F. M. Kinter, Democratic

Other candidates
Elmer D. Wallace, People's
(FNU) Reeves, Independent

Results

References

1894
North Dakota
Gubernatorial